The New Zealand striped skink (Oligosoma striatum) is a rare species of medium-sized skink endemic to New Zealand. The specific epithet means "streaked". The habitat of this species is native forest; they are often found under fallen rotting logs in the bush or under those remaining in pasture after the forest has been cleared. They are at least partly arboreal and have been found in the forest canopy among epiphytes and also in standing dead trees.

Conservation status 
In 2012 the Department of Conservation classified the striped skink as At Risk under the New Zealand Threat Classification System. It was judged as meeting the criteria for At Risk threat status as a result of it having a low to high ongoing or predicted decline. This skink is also regarded as being Data Poor, Sparse and Conservation Dependent.

References

External links 
 factsheet

Oligosoma
Reptiles of New Zealand
Endemic fauna of New Zealand
Reptiles described in 1871
Taxa named by Walter Buller
Endemic reptiles of New Zealand